A safari is an overland journey.

Safari may also refer to:

Zoological parks 
Safari park, a drive-through animal park
Karachi Safari Park, a children's park in Pakistan
Ramat Gan Safari, a zoo in Israel

Computing 
Safari (web browser), a web browser developed by Apple Inc.
SAFARI, a proposed French government database of personal data
SimSafari, a 1998 computer game

Drinks 
Safari, another name for Yop, a yoghurt drink
Orange Safari, a cocktail

Music 
The Safaris, an American pop group
Safari (Gnags album)
Safari (Jovanotti album)
Safari, by Victoria Kimani
Safari (EP), by The Breeders
Safari (Miranda! album), 2014
"Safari" (J Balvin song), 2016

Vehicles 
GMC Safari, a van
Pontiac Safari, a station wagon
Citroën Safari, a version of the Citroën DS
Tata Safari, an SUV
Saab Safari, an aircraft
Safari Helicopter a kit helicopter

Media 
 Books and magazines
Safari (novel), a series of books by Ahmed Khaled Towfik
Safari Books Online, an online service
Safari magazine, an Indian scientific magazine

 Film and cinema
 Safari (1940 film), an American film from 1940 with Douglas Fairbanks, Jr. and Madeleine Carroll
 Safari (1956 film), a British film from 1956 with Victor Mature and Janet Leigh
 Safari (1991 film), a French TV film directed by Roger Vadim
 Safari (1999 film), a Bollywood film directed by Jyotin Goel
 Safari (2016 film), a  documentary film directed by Ulrich Seidl
Safari Cinema, a former cinema in Croydon, London

 Television
 Safari TV, a Malayalam language travel television channel

Other 
SAFARI-1, a South African nuclear research reactor
Safari Club, an alliance of intelligence services formed in 1976 that ran covert operations around Africa
Behrang Safari (born 1985), Swedish footballer
HMS Safari (P211), a British S-class submarine
Mahal Safari, an alternate spelling of Mehal Sefari, an elite Ethiopian military unit
Safari Kimanzi (born 1994), Kenyan boy who received surgery in Australia due to severe burns
Safari Rally, a rallying competition in Kenya
Safari Sevens, a Kenyan rugby sevens tournament
A tradename for dinotefuran, a neonicotinoid insecticide

See also
Safari jacket, a type of clothing
The Surfaris, an American surf rock band